Crete is a village in Will County, Illinois, United States, a south suburb of Chicago. The population was 8,259 at the 2010 census. Originally named Wood's Corner, it was founded in 1836 by Vermonters Dyantha and Willard Wood.

Geography
Crete is located at  (41.455910, -87.618798).

Demographics

As of the 2000 census, there were 7,346 people, 2,704 households, and 2,090 families residing in the village. The racial makeup of the village was 86.46% White, 10.47% African American, 0.07% Native American, 0.75% Asian, 0.01% Pacific Islander, 0.93% from other races, and 1.32% from two or more races. Hispanic or Latino of any race were 3.63% of the population.

There were 2,704 households, out of which 34.1% had children under the age of 18 living with them, 66.4% were married couples living together, 7.3% had a female householder with no husband present, and 22.7% were non-families. 19.2% of all households were made up of individuals, and 8.3% had someone living alone who was 65 years of age or older. The average household size was 2.67 and the average family size was 3.06.

In the village, the population was spread out, with 24.7% under the age of 18, 6.2% from 18 to 24, 26.8% from 25 to 44, 28.4% from 45 to 64, and 13.9% who were 65 years of age or older. The median age was 41 years. For every 100 females, there were 95.9 males. For every 100 females age 18 and over, there were 92.4 males.

The median income for a household in the village was $67,671, and the median income for a family was $73,987. Males had a median income of $51,191 versus $31,090 for females. The per capita income for the village was $29,671. About 0.6% of families and 1.6% of the population were below the poverty line, including 0.2% of those under age 18 and 3.7% of those age 65 or over.

Education
All public schools in Crete are managed by Crete Monee Community Unit School District 201U, which is a unit school district which combines elementary, middle, and high schools. Serving the village of Crete are:

 Crete Elementary School (pre-kindergarten through 5th grade)
 Crete Monee Sixth Grade Center (6th grade)
 Crete Monee Middle School (7th & 8th grade)
 Crete-Monee High School (9th through 12th grades)

Illinois Lutheran is a Pre-K to 12th grade school of the Wisconsin Evangelical Lutheran Synod in Crete.

Governors State University is in University Park, which borders Crete.

Local attractions
 Crete is home to Balmoral Park Racetrack.
 The forest preserve along with Plum Creek (Goodenow Grove), a park with ice skating and sledding in the winter, and hiking in the summer. (Goodenow Grove does, however, have a Beecher, Illinois address.)

References

External links
Official village website
Crete-Monee School District 201-U

Villages in Illinois
Villages in Will County, Illinois
Populated places established in 1836
1836 establishments in Illinois